The Mohawk Valley region of the U.S. state of New York is the area surrounding the Mohawk River, sandwiched between the Adirondack Mountains and Catskill Mountains, northwest of the Capital District. As of the 2010 United States Census, the region's counties have a combined population of 622,133 people. In addition to the Mohawk River valley, the region contains portions of other major watersheds such as the Susquehanna River.

The region is a suburban and rural area surrounding the industrialized cities of Schenectady, Utica and Rome, along with other smaller commercial centers. The  area is an important agricultural center and encompasses the heavily forested wilderness areas just to the north that are part of New York's Adirondack Park.

The Mohawk Valley is a natural passageway connecting the Atlantic Ocean, by way of the Hudson Valley, with the interior of North America. Native American Nations of the Iroquois Confederacy lived in the region. In the 17th century, Dutch, French and English immigrants  —and in the 18th century German, Irish and Scottish—settled the area. Following the rapid industrialization of the mid-19th century, Italians and Welsh People settled in the valley.

During the 18th Century, the Mohawk Valley was a frontier of great political, military, and economic importance. Colonists— such as Phillip Schuyler, Nicholas Herkimer, William Johnson—trading with the Iroquois set the stage for commercial and military competition between European nations, leading to the French and Indian Wars and the American Revolution. Almost 100 battles of the American Revolution were fought in New York State, including the Battle of Oriskany and defense of Fort Stanwix. During the war, a series of raids against valley residents took place led by John Johnson. These raids were collectively known as the "Burning of the Valleys".

In 1825, the Erie Canal was completed as the first commercial connection between the American East and West.

Strategic importance

During the French and Indian War, the Mohawk River Valley was of prime strategic importance; to the British, it provided a corridor to the Great Lakes from which to threaten New France directly, while to the French it provided a corridor to the Hudson Valley and on to the heart of British North America.  In addition, many settlements of the Mohawk, Britain's crucial Indian ally at the time of the war, were located in or near the valley.

At the beginning of the war, the major British stronghold in the Mohawk corridor was Fort Oswego, located on Lake Ontario.  The French captured and destroyed the fort after a short siege in 1756, and the Mohawk Valley lay open to French advance as a result.  Although the French did not directly exploit this avenue of attack, its impact swayed some of the Iroquois tribes to the French side.

Mohawks of Mohawk Valley

The original inhabitants of the Mohawk Valley can be traced back 10,000 plus years and included Algonquian people that later relocated from the newly established Fort Orange Dutch trading post region as early as 1624, as the name implies, the inhabitants were and remained Mohawks. The name Mohawk Valley has its origins in the years 1614 and 1624-25 following the settlement by Dutch traders who established a trading post in the Valley, the Mohawk tribe became alliances and targets during the Indian Wars.
The Mohawks of Mohawk Valley call themselves Kanien'keha'ka, and "People of the Flint" in part due to their creation story of a powerful flinted arrow. Among other things, the traditional use of Mohawk Valley flint as Toolmaking Flint is only one attribution to the Mohawk Valley People of the Flint name.

Counties
Schoharie
Montgomery
Fulton
Herkimer
Oneida
Otsego

Schoharie County is sometimes considered to be part of the Mohawk Valley because the Schoharie Creek, primarily located in Schoharie County, is a major tributary that empties into the Mohawk River at Fort Hunter in Montgomery County.  Furthermore, the northern border of Schoharie County with Montgomery County is very close to the Mohawk River.

Major cities and villages 

Montgomery County
Amsterdam
Canajoharie
Fonda
Fort Plain
Fultonville
Nelliston
Palatine Bridge
St. Johnsville

Fulton County
Gloversville
Johnstown

Herkimer County
Frankfort
Herkimer
Ilion
Little Falls
Mohawk

Oneida County
Sherrill
Rome
Utica

Otsego County
Cooperstown
Oneonta

Schoharie County
Middleburgh
Schoharie
Cobleskill

Popular culture

 Drums Along the Mohawk (1936) an historical novel written by Walter D. Edmonds, is set in the Mohawk Valley near Deerfield during the American Revolutionary War. It was very carefully researched and portrayed the complexity of the times. The 1939 film of the same name, directed by John Ford, has been criticized for “ [ abandoning ] the historical complexity of the original for the mythic simplification of an all-American Western.” 
 The Mohawk Valley is an important site in the video game Assassin's Creed III published by Ubisoft. The game takes place during the Revolutionary War era and features an assassin tasked with playing a role in the history of early America.

See also
Mohawk Valley formula

Sources

Burning of the Valleys Military Association
Fort Johnson in the Mohawk Valley
Mohawk Valley Heritage Corridor Commission

Valleys of New York (state)
Regions of New York (state)
Upstate New York
River valleys of the United States
Landforms of Schenectady County, New York
Landforms of Montgomery County, New York
Landforms of Fulton County, New York
Landforms of Herkimer County, New York
Landforms of Oneida County, New York
Landforms of Otsego County, New York